The 2019 IAAF World Challenge was the tenth edition of the annual IAAF World Challenge, a nine-leg series of track and field meetings. The Jamaica International Invitational was cancelled at the last minute due to financial issues and thus the series this year comprises only eight meetings. The Meeting de Atletismo Madrid was not part of the series for the first time, but was replaced by a new meeting, the Nanjing World Challenge.

Schedule
The following nine meetings were scheduled to be included in the 2019 season:

Season overview
 Events held at IAAF World Challenge meets, but not included in the IAAF World Challenge points race, are marked in grey background.
 IAAF World Challenge winners are marked with light blue background.

Men

Track

Field

Women

Track

Field

References

External links

Official website

World Challenge Meetings
2019